Bakdal-dong (박달동, 博達洞) is neighborhood of Manan district in the city of Anyang, Gyeonggi Province, South Korea. It is officially divided into Bakdal-1-dong and Bakdal-2-dong.

External links
 Bakdal-1-dong 
 Bakdal-2-dong 

Manan-gu
Neighbourhoods in Anyang, Gyeonggi